The 2017–18 Houston Baptist Huskies men's basketball team represented Houston Baptist University in the 2017–18 NCAA Division I men's basketball season. They were led by head coach Ron Cottrell in his 27th season at HBU. The Huskies played their home games at Sharp Gymnasium as members of the Southland Conference. They finished the season 6–25, 2–16 in Southland play to finish in a tie for 11th place. They failed to qualify for the Southland tournament.

Previous season 
The Huskies finished the 2016–17 season 17–14, 12–6 in Southland play to finish in a three-way tie for second place. They lost in the quarterfinals of the Southland tournament to Sam Houston State. The Huskies received an invitation to the CollegeInsider.com Tournament where they lost in the first round to Campbell.

Roster

Schedule and results

|-
!colspan=12 style=|Non-conference regular season

|-
!colspan=12 style=|Southland regular season

See also
2017–18 Houston Baptist Huskies women's basketball team

References

Houston Christian Huskies men's basketball seasons
Houston Baptist
Houston Baptist Huskies basketball
Houston Baptist Huskies basketball